Knickerbocker is an unincorporated community in southwestern Tom Green County, Texas, United States.  It lies along Farm to Market Road 2335 southwest of the city of San Angelo, the county seat of Tom Green County.  Its elevation is 2,051 feet (625 m).  Although Knickerbocker is unincorporated, it has a post office, with the ZIP code of 76939.

Named for Washington Irving's character Diedrich Knickerbocker by early settlers related to Irving, the community quickly became significant, being the most important community in the county aside from San Angelo.  Agriculture was long the community's mainstay, between grain farming and sheep ranching.  The first settlers in the area arrived in 1875, and the first townsite was established along Dove Creek; Knickerbocker's post office was established in 1881 and rebuilt in 1896 and 1936.  The community was moved in 1889 around a nearby hill to have better access to water.  Local children were able to attend school in Knickerbocker starting in 1889, but the school was closed and merged into Christoval's system in 1956.

References

External links

Unincorporated communities in Tom Green County, Texas
Unincorporated communities in Texas